Macrochenus melanospilus is a species of beetle in the family Cerambycidae. It was described by Charles Joseph Gahan in 1906. It is known from Malaysia and Borneo.

References

Lamiini
Beetles described in 1906